Michael or Mike Webster may refer to:

Mike Webster (1952–2002), American football player 
Mike Webster (Canadian football) (born 1944), Canadian clinical psychologist and former football player 
Michael Webster (public servant), New Zealand public servant

See also
Micheál Webster (born 1977), Irish hurler and Gaelic footballer
Michael Riddell-Webster, British Army officer
Alwyne Michael Webster Whistler (1909–1993), British Army officer